G. rosea may refer to:
 Gabbiella rosea, a gastropod species endemic to Kenya
 Gaertnera rosea, a plant species endemic to Sri Lanka
 Geocrinia rosea, the karri or roseate frog, a frog species endemic to Southwest Australia
 Grammostola rosea, the Chilean rose tarantula, the Chilean flame tarantula or Chilean fire tarantula, a spider species

See also
 Rosea (disambiguation)